{{DISPLAYTITLE:C18H22N2O2}}
The molecular formula C18H22N2O2 (molar mass: 298.38 g/mol, exact mass: 298.1681 u) may refer to:

 4-AcO-DALT
 Carazolol
 Fumigaclavine A
 Phenacaine